Duguid is a Scottish surname, most likely derived from a nickname for a well-intentioned person, from the Middle English  ('do') and  ('good'). Notable people with the surname include:

Andy Duguid (born 1982), German-Scottish DJ and producer
Brad Duguid (born 1962), Canadian politician
Charles Duguid (1884–1986), Scottish-born Australian Aboriginal rights campaigner
Dale Duguid, Australian visual effects supervisor and producer
David Duguid (1832–1907), Scottish cabinet-maker and medium
David Duguid (born 1970), British politician
Don Duguid (born 1935), Canadian curler
Gerry Duguid (1929–1993), Canadian football player
Irvin Duguid (born 1969), Scottish musician
Jim Duguid, Scottish musician
Karl Duguid (born 1978), English football player
Lorne Duguid (1910–1981), Canadian ice hockey player
Naomi Duguid (born 1950), Canadian food writer
Nigel Duguid (born 1969), West Indian cricket umpire
Terry Duguid (born 1954 or 1955), Canadian politician
William Duguid Geddes (1828–1900), Scottish scholar

Others
 Facebook v. Duguid, a 2021 U.S. Supreme Court case

References

Scottish surnames